is a Japanese former footballer and beach soccer player.

Career statistics

Club

Notes

References

External links
 Official website

1985 births
Living people
Association football people from Kanagawa Prefecture
Nippon Bunri University alumni
Okinawa International University alumni
Japanese footballers
Japanese beach soccer players
Japanese expatriate footballers
Association football midfielders
Singapore Premier League players
Albirex Niigata Singapore FC players
Japanese expatriate sportspeople in Singapore
Expatriate footballers in Singapore
Japanese expatriate sportspeople in Switzerland
Japanese expatriate sportspeople in Italy
Japanese expatriate sportspeople in Brazil
Japanese expatriate sportspeople in Germany
Japanese expatriate sportspeople in Israel
Japanese expatriate sportspeople in the United States
Japanese expatriate sportspeople in China
Japanese expatriate sportspeople in Portugal
Japanese expatriate sportspeople in Spain
Japanese expatriate sportspeople in Estonia
Japanese expatriate sportspeople in France